Allard van der Scheer may refer to:

 Allard van der Scheer, a doctor in the Dutch East Indies
 Allard van der Scheer, an actor in the Netherlands